Barbara Pickersgill (born 1940) is a British botanist with a special interest in the domestication of crops, the genetics, taxonomy, and evolutionary biology of cultivated plants, and the preservation of crop diversity. Her 1966 dissertation for the degree of Doctor of Philosophy from Indiana University concerned the taxonomy of Capsicum chinense. Her doctoral advisor was Charles B. Heiser.

When she was awarded the Linnean Medal it was noted that she "is well known throughout the world for her distinguished investigations on the genetics, cytology and systematics of the genus Capsicum". As well as investigating the origins of domesticated pepper species she also investigated the origins of other cultivated plants, including Vicia, Psophocarpus, Lens, Cicer, Arachis, Ananas, Gossypium, Ipomoea and Zea. She also carried out collecting expeditions to Peru, Brazil, Belize and Papua New Guinea.

In 2005 she retired from the School of Biological Sciences at the University of Reading, to become an Honorary Research Associate. Her research projects include:
 The molecular systematics and the use of wild species in the improvement of farmed chilis (Capsicum) 
 Research on the domestication of crops, notably the common bean, Phaseolus vulgaris, working with the Centro Internacional de Agricultura Tropical (CIAT) in Colombia
 The genetic diversity, conservation and improvement of tropical crops such as:
Quinoa (Chenopodium quinoa), working with the Centro Internacional de la Papa (CIP) in Peru
Banana (Musa species) from the East African Highlands

Honours
In 1993 the Linnean Society of London presented Pickersgill with the Linnean Medal for her contribution to botany.

In 2000 she was the president of the Society for Economic Botany.

On 4 August 2006 the Linnean Society of London organised a one-day conference in honour of Pickersgill.

References

External links 

 Harvard University Herbaria, Index of Botanists, Author Query for 'Pickersgill'

British botanists
1940 births
British women scientists
Academics of the University of Reading
Linnean Medallists
Living people
Indiana University alumni